The Abyssinian Shorthorned Zebu is an Ethiopian breed or group of breeds of zebuine cattle. It is not reported to DAD-IS as a breed.

Breeds or strains of the Abyssinian Shorthorned Zebu include:

 the Adwa
 the Ambo
 the Arsi or Arusi
 the Bale
 the Goffa or Goffa Dwarf
 the Guraghe
 the Hammer
 the Harar
 the Jem-Jem or Black Highland Cattle
 the Jijiga
 the Mursi
 the Ogaden Zebu or Lowland Zebu
 the Smada.

Other breeds or types that may fall within this group include the Anniya, the Buche, the Dega, the Issa, the Jilbeguro, the Salea and the Sidamo.

References 

Cattle breeds
Cattle breeds originating in Ethiopia